Tamer Karadağlı (born 24 May 1967) is a Turkish actor.

Biography
Tamer Karadağlı's family was of Azerbaijanis origin and moved to America a short time after he was born. They returned to Turkey just as he began primary school there. He studied at Çankaya High School.and TED Ankara College after which graduated in theatre from Bilkent University Conservatory. 

In 1993 he made his television debut in Ferhunde Hanımlar . Between 2002-2019, He became well known for starring in the hit sitcom Çocuklar Duymasın which one of the longest Turkish series. Karadağlı also appeared as Timur in the series Şaşıfelek Çıkmazı and in the films Beyza'nın Kadınları and Living & Dying

In 2012, he starred with Seda Eğridere in the Turkish action film Alina, the Turkish Assassin. Consulting director/producer for the film was the American director Bobby Roth whose directing credits include Lost, Prison Break, Revenge and Marvel's Agents of S.H.I.E.L.D.. Sex scenes in the film generated a lot of buzz around the film.

He married the actress Arzu Balkan in 2002 but they divorced in 2007. They have a daughter.

Filmography

References

External links
 

1967 births
Living people
People from Ankara
Turkish male film actors
Turkish male television actors
Turkish male stage actors
Bilkent University alumni
Turkish people of Azerbaijani descent
Golden Butterfly Award winners
Turkish expatriates in the United States